Ndulu (also known as Andulo, Ondulu or Ondura) was one of the traditional independent Ovimbundu kingdoms in Angola.

See also
Cingolo
Civula
Ciyaka
Ekekete

References

Ovimbundu kingdoms